Filipe Miguel Nicolácia da Cruz (born 19 February 2002) is a Portuguese professional footballer who plays as a rightback for Benfica B in Liga Portugal 2.

Playing career
On 26 February 2018, Cruz signed his first professional contract with Benfica. Cruz made his professional debut with Benfica B in a 2-0 Liga Portugal 2 loss to C.D. Feirense on 5 December 2020.

References

External links
 
 
 

2002 births
Living people
People from Faro, Portugal
Portuguese footballers
Portugal youth international footballers
Portuguese sportspeople of Cape Verdean descent
Association football fullbacks
Liga Portugal 2 players
S.L. Benfica B players
Sportspeople from Faro District